Maynooth railway station serves the town of Maynooth in north County Kildare, Ireland.

It is a key exchange station on the Dublin to Maynooth commuter services, Dublin to Mullingar/Longford long-distance commuter service and Dublin to Sligo InterCity service.

Description
It is situated on the south side of the Royal Canal, opposite Dukes' Harbour. Access to Maynooth is by either the footbridge to the west, which leads to the Main Street of Maynooth; west along the canal walk to residential areas of the town, or via the road bridges to the east, which lead north to the older part of Maynooth, or south to the newer areas.

The station has two staffed ticket desks and four automated ticket machines, one inside and three outside the station building. The ticket office is open from 06:00 AM to 23:15 PM, Monday to Sunday.

The footbridge crossing the tracks and connecting the two platforms was originally situated at Lansdowne Road railway station.

From Maynooth onwards to Sligo, the line is a single-track railway, the line being a double-track railway from Maynooth to Bray.

The 2018 NTA Heavy Rail Census showed 6,625 passengers using the station on the day of the survey, up from 6,228 in 2017 and 5,262 in 2016.

Platforms
The station has two platforms; platform 1 on the north side of the station (where the station building is located) and platform 2 over the footbridge on the south side of the station. Platform 2 is used only a few times a day, when Commuter and InterCity services are in the station at the same time.

See also
 List of railway stations in Ireland
 Rail transport in Ireland

References

External links

 Irish Rail Maynooth Station Website

Iarnród Éireann stations in County Kildare
Railway stations opened in 1848
1848 establishments in Ireland
Railway stations closed in 1963
1963 disestablishments in Ireland
1981 establishments in Ireland
Railway stations opened in 1981
Railway stations in the Republic of Ireland opened in 1848
Railway stations in the Republic of Ireland opened in the 20th century